George Platt Lynes (April 15, 1907 – December 6, 1955) was an American fashion and commercial photographer who worked in the 1930s and 1940s. He produced photographs featuring many gay artists and writers from the 1940s that were acquired by the Kinsey Institute after his death in 1955.

Early life 
Born in East Orange, New Jersey to Adelaide Sparkman and Joseph Russell Lynes (died 1932). His younger brother was Joseph Russell Lynes, Jr. (1910–1991). Lynes spent his childhood in New Jersey but attended the Berkshire School in Massachusetts, where he was a classmate of Lincoln Kirstein (1907–1996). He was sent to Paris in 1925 with the idea of better preparing him for college. His life was forever changed by the circle of friends that he would meet there including Gertrude Stein, Glenway Wescott, Monroe Wheeler. He attended Yale University in 1926, but dropped out after a year to move to New York City.

Career 
He returned to the United States with the idea of a literary career and he even opened a bookstore in Englewood, New Jersey in 1927. He first became interested in photography not with the idea of a career, but to take photographs of his friends and display them in his bookstore.
 
Returning to France the next year in the company of Wescott and Wheeler, he traveled around Europe for the next several years, always with his camera at hand. He developed close friendships within a larger circle of artists including Jean Cocteau and Julien Levy, the art dealer and critic. Levy would exhibit his photographs in his gallery in New York City in 1932 and Lynes would open his studio there that same year.

Commercial work 

He was soon receiving commissions from Harper's Bazaar, Town & Country, and Vogue including a cover with perhaps the first supermodel, Lisa Fonssagrives.  In 1935, he was asked to document the principal dancers and productions of Kirstein's and George Balanchine's newly founded American Ballet company (now the New York City Ballet).

Private collection 
He was also most notably friends with Katherine Anne Porter, author of the novel Ship of Fools, who he often enjoyed photographing wearing elaborate evening gowns and occasionally reenacting Shakespeare.
 
During his lifetime, Lynes amassed a substantial body of work involving nude and homoerotic photography. In the 1930s, he began taking nudes of friends, performers, and models, including a young Yul Brynner, although these remained private, unknown, and unpublished for years. Over the following two decades, Lynes continued his work in this area passionately, albeit privately. "The depth and commitment he had in photographing the male nude, from the start of his career to the end, was astonishing. There was absolutely no commercial impulse involved — he couldn't exhibit it, he couldn't publish it." – Allen Ellenzweig, art and photography critic who wrote the introduction to George Platt Lynes: The Male Nudes, published in 2011 by Rizzoli.
 
In the late 1940s, Lynes became acquainted with Dr. Alfred Kinsey and his Institute in Bloomington, Indiana. Kinsey took an interest in Lynes work, as he was researching homosexuality in America at the time. A large number of Lynes' nude and homoerotic works were left to the Kinsey Institute after his death in 1955. The body of work residing at the Kinsey Institute remained largely unknown until it was made public and published later. The Kinsey collection represents one of the largest single collections of Lynes's work.

Personal life 
For over ten years, Lynes had a love affair with both Monroe Wheeler, the curator, and Glenway Wescott (1901–1987), the writer.  He later got together with his studio assistant and, after he died in World War II, Lynes moved in with the younger brother of the assistant.

Death 
By May 1955, Lynes had been diagnosed with terminal lung cancer. He closed his studio and was reported to have destroyed much of his print and negative archives, particularly his male nudes. However, it is now known that he had transferred many of these works to the Kinsey Institute. "He clearly was concerned that this work, which he considered his greatest achievement as a photographer, should not be dispersed or destroyed...We have to remember the time period we're talking about—America during the post-war Red Scare..."

After a final trip to Europe, Lynes returned to New York City, where he died in 1955, while living with his brother and his family.

Exhibitions

Solo 

 1932, Julian Levy Gallery, New York, NY
 1960, Portraits by George Platt Lynes, The Art Institute of Chicago, Chicago, IL
 1980, Fleeting Gestures: Treasure of Dance Photography, Institute of Contemporary Art, University of Pennsylvania, Philadelphia, PA
 1993, George Platt Lynes: A New Look, Wessel + O'Connor Fine Art, New York, NY
 1993, George Platt Lynes: Photographs from the Kinsey Institute, Grey Art Gallery at New York University, New York, NY
 1997 George Platt Lynes, Wessel + O'Connor Fine Art, New York, NY
 2003, George Balanchine and his Dancers: the Ballet Photography of George Platt Lynes, The Kinsey Institute Gallery, Bloomington, IN
 2005, Fashioning Celebrity: Photographs of George Platt Lynes, Harry Ransom Center, Austin, TX
 2005, George Platt Lynes, Wessel + O'Connor Fine Art, New York, NY
 2008, Vintage Ballet Photographs, Craig Krull Gallery, Santa Monica, CA
 2011, George Platt Lynes, Throckmorton Fine Art, New York, NY
 2012, George Platt Lynes, Steven Kasher Gallery, New York, NY
 2014, George Platt Lynes, Wessel + O'Connor Fine Art, Lambertville, NJ

Group 

 1932, Murals by American Painters and Photographers, Museum of Modern Art, New York, NY
 1937, Fantastic Art, Dada, Surrealism, Museum of Modern Art, New York, NY
 1951, Abstraction in Photography, Museum of Modern Art, New York, NY
 1977, documenta 6, Documenta, Kassel, Germany
 1992, Figure/Form: The Nude in 20th Century Photography, Jan Kesner Gallery, Los Angeles, CA
 1992, Classic Dualities: The Photographs of Len Prince taken at the Tampa Museum of Art, Fay Gold Gallery, Atlanta, GA
 1999, Figurescapes, Radiant Light Gallery, Portland, ME
 2001, Interwoven Lives: George Platt Lynes and his Friends, DC Moore Gallery, New York, NY
 2002, Mirror, Mirror, on the Wall, Art Gallery of Ontario, Toronto, Ontario, Canada
 2003, Flesh Tones – 100 Years of the Nude, Robert Mann Gallery, New York, NY
 2003, Artseal Gallery Photo SF Preview, Artseal Gallery, San Francisco, CA
 2003, Herb Ritts Private Collection, Fahey/Klein Gallery, Los Angeles, CA
 2003, Boys of Summer, ClampArt, New York, NY
 2005, Summer Skin, Stephen Cohen Gallery, Los Angeles, CA
 2005, From the Source, Fashion Photographs, Corkin Gallery, Toronto, Ontario, Canada
 2005, Beyond Real Part 1 Dressing Up, Australian Centre for Photography, Sydney, Australia
 2005, 20th Anniversary Show, Wessel + O'Connor Fine Art, New York, NY
 2006, American Icons, Corkin Gallery, Toronto, Ontario, Canada
 2006, Busy going crazy: The Sylvio Perlstein Collection, La Maison Rouge, Paris, France
 2007, Igor Strawinsky – ich muss die Kunst anfassen, Museum der Moderne Rupertinum, Salzburg, Austria
 2007, VIP, National Gallery of Australia, Canberra, Australia
 2007, Classic Beauty: Part 2 Photographs of the Male Nude, Throckmorton Fine Art, New York, NY
 2007, MODE: BILDER, NRW Forum Kultur und Wirtschaft, Düsseldorf, Germany
 2008, Vintage / Vantage, Wessel + O'Connor Fine Art, New York, NY
 2008, Pre-Revolutionary Queer: Gay Art and Culture Before Stonewall, The Kinsey Institute, Bloomington, IN
 2010, Flirting with Bling, Corkin Gallery, Toronto, Ontario, Canada
 2010, Nature & Nurture: Exploring Human Reproduction from Pregnancy through Early Childhood, The Kinsey Institute, Bloomington, IN
 2010, Staff Picks 2010, Howard Greenberg Gallery, New York, NY
 2010, 25 Years / 25 Works, Wessel + O'Connor Fine Art, Washington, D.C.
 2011, Narcissus Reflected, Fruitmarket Gallery, Edinburgh, Scotland
 2011, An Intimate Circle, DC Moore Gallery, New York, NY
 2011, Psyche & Muse: Creative Entanglements with the Science of the Soul, Beinecke Library at Yale University, New Haven, CT
 2013, Fashion: Photography from the Condé Nast Archives, Fondazione Forma per la Fotografia, Milan, Italy

 2019, Sex Crimes, ClampArt, New York, NY

Collections 

 Musée des beaux-arts du Canada, National Gallery of Canada
 Cape Breton University Art Gallery permanent collection in Nova Scotia.
 Centre Pompidou Musée National d́Art Moderne, Paris
 Musée d'Art Moderne et Contemporain, Strasbourg
 The Secret Museum, Montreal
 The Israel Museum, Jerusalem
 The Art Institute of Chicago, Chicago, IL
 Los Angeles County Museum of Art – LACMA, Los Angeles, CA
 Norton Museum of Art, West Palm Beach, FL
 Guggenheim Museum, New York, NY
 National Portrait Gallery, London

References 
Citations

Works cited
 James Crump (1993). George Platt Lynes: Photographs from the Kinsey Institute. Bulfinch Press/Little Brown & Company. .
 James Crump and Anatole Pohorilenko (1998). When we were three: The travel albums of George Platt Lynes, Monroe Wheeler, and Glenway Wescott, 1925–1935. Arena Editions. .

External links 

  Image of George Platt Lynes, Self-Portrait, Hollywood, California, 1947.
 Queer Arts Biopic
 
 Portraits by George Platt Lynes at the National Portrait Gallery, London.
 George Platt Lynes Diaries and Memorabilia. Yale Collection of American Literature, Beinecke Rare Book and Manuscript Library.
 George Platt Lynes Scrapbooks. Yale Collection of American Literature, Beinecke Rare Book and Manuscript Library.
 

1907 births
1955 deaths
Commercial photographers
Fashion photographers
American portrait photographers
Nude photography
American gay artists
American LGBT photographers
LGBT people from New Jersey
Artists from New Jersey
People from East Orange, New Jersey
Burials at Woodlawn Cemetery (Bronx, New York)
Berkshire School alumni
20th-century American photographers
20th-century American male artists
20th-century American LGBT people